Ephraim II (Eprem) (October 19, 1896 – April 7, 1972) was a Catholicos-Patriarch of All Georgia from 1960 until his death. His full title was His Holiness and Beatitude, Archbishop of Mtskheta-Tbilisi and Catholicos-Patriarch of All Georgia.

Born as Grigol Sidamonidze, the future prelate graduated from the Tiflis Theological Seminary in 1918 and from the Tbilisi State University with a degree in philosophy in 1925. He became a monk in 1922. At various times, from 1927 to 1960, he served as bishop of Nikortsminda, bishop of Gelati and Kutaisi, and metropolitan of Batumi-Shemokmedi and Chkondidi. After the death of Melchizedek III in 1960, Ephraim was elected to the office of Catholicos-Patriarch of Georgia. During his tenure, Ephraim tried to avoid confrontation with the Soviet government, but produced a series of sermons, appealing to Georgian patriotism, for which he gained popularity. At the same time, he cultivated friendly ties with the Russian Orthodox Church and the Armenian Apostolic Church and, in 1962, brought the Georgian church into the World Council of Churches (of which it would remain a member until 1997). He died in 1972 and was interred at the Tbilisi Sioni Cathedral.

References 

1896 births
1972 deaths
Catholicoses and Patriarchs of Georgia (country)
Eastern Orthodox Christians from Georgia (country)